Brahma Vav is a stepwell in Khedbrahma, Gujarat, India. It was built in 14th century.

History 
The stepwell is situated opposite the Brahma temple. Based on ornamentation of the miniature shrines in the stepwell, it is dated to 14th century. There is no inscription in the stepwell to ascertain its age.

There are some paliya (hero stone) dedicated to Dhabi gatekeepers of the village who died fighting Maharaja Shivsinhji of Idar around Samvat 1800. The inscriptions on them are worn out.

Humad Digambara Jains and Khedaval Brahmins consider the stepwell sacred and used to worship their patron deities in it.

Architecture
The stepwell is built with grey granite stone. It is constructed in east-west direction; the entrance is in the east and the well is in the west. The stepwell becomes narrower as one goes downwards and to the well. It has four kuta (pavilion-towers) where fourth is attached to the well. It had row of miniature shrines as an ornamentation in the wall of shaft of the stepwell which suggests it was built in 14th century. They resemble temple spires and has niches. It has 27 niches without any idols now. It is now in despair due to lack of maintenance.

See also
 Brahma Kund
Rani ki vav
 History of stepwells in Gujarat

References

Stepwells in Gujarat
Khedbrahma
Tourist attractions in Sabarkantha district